The Lord's Lantern in Budapest is a 1999 Hungarian film directed by Miklós Jancsó. It was Hungary's official Best Foreign Language Film submission at the 72nd Academy Awards, but did not manage to receive a nomination.

Cast
Zoltán Mucsi	... 	Kapa
Péter Scherer	... 	Pepe
József Szarvas	... 	Józsi
Miklós Jancsó	... 	Himself
Gyula Hernádi	... 	Himself
...

See also
 List of submissions to the 72nd Academy Awards for Best Foreign Language Film
 List of Hungarian submissions for the Academy Award for Best Foreign Language Film

References

External links

1990s Hungarian-language films
1999 films
1999 drama films
Films directed by Miklós Jancsó
Hungarian drama films